Marpesia is a butterfly genus in the family Nymphalidae. The species of this genus are found in the Neotropical and Nearctic realms.

Species
The genus includes the following species, listed alphabetically:
 Marpesia berania (Hewitson, 1852) – amber daggerwing (Mexico, Colombia Ecuador, Brazil (Amazonas), Peru, Honduras)
 Marpesia chiron (Fabricius, 1775) – many-banded daggerwing (southern United States, Haiti, Jamaica, Cuba, Mexico to Ecuador, Suriname)
 Marpesia corinna (Latreille, [1813]) – Corinna daggerwing (Colombia, Peru)
 Marpesia corita (Westwood, 1850) – orange-banded daggerwing (Mexico, Guatemala, Honduras)
 Marpesia crethon (Fabricius, 1776) – Crethon daggerwing (Suriname, Peru, Ecuador, Colombia, Venezuela)
 Marpesia egina (Bates, 1865) – Egina daggerwing (Brazil (Amazonas), Peru)
 Marpesia eleuchea Hübner, 1818 – Antillean daggerwing (Cuba, Bahamas, Dominican Republic, Antilles)
 Marpesia furcula (Fabricius, 1793) – sunset daggerwing (Nicaragua, Panama, Ecuador, Peru, Bolivia, Brazil (Amazonas), Argentina)
 Marpesia harmonia (Klug, 1836) – pale daggerwing or Harmonia daggerwing (Mexico)
 Marpesia livius (Kirby, 1871) – Livius daggerwing (Mexico to Panama, Bolivia, Peru, Ecuador)
 Marpesia marcella (C. & R. Felder, 1861) – pansy daggerwing (Guatemala, Costa Rica, Panama, Ecuador, Colombia, Peru)
 Marpesia merops (Doyère, [1840]) – dappled daggerwing (Guatemala to Bolivia)
 Marpesia orsilochus (Fabricius, 1776) – Orsilochus daggerwing (Suriname, Brazil)
 Marpesia petreus (Cramer, [1776]) – ruddy daggerwing (United States (Texas, Florida), Guadelope, Mexico)
 Marpesia themistocles (Fabricius, 1793) – Norica daggerwing (Ecuador, Peru, Brazil (Amazonas))
 Marpesia tutelina (Hewitson, 1852) – Tutelina daggerwing (Brazil (Amazonas))
 Marpesia zerynthia Hübner, [1823] – waiter daggerwing (United States (Texas), Colombia, Peru, Ecuador Brazil (Bahia))

References

Cyrestinae
Nymphalidae of South America
Nymphalidae genera
Taxa named by Jacob Hübner